The Jenner, California, double murder of 2004 occurred on the night of August 14–15, 2004, in which a young couple was shot to death as they slept on a state beach. The bodies of Lindsay Cutshall, 22, and her fiancé Jason S. Allen, 26, were found on Fish Head Beach, between Russian Gulch and the mouth of the Russian River, in the small coastal hamlet of Jenner, California. Both Cutshall and Allen were killed with a .45-caliber Marlin rifle as they slept in their sleeping bags on the beach. The Sonoma County Coroner's Office estimated that the couple was slain on either the night of August 14, 2004 or in the early morning hours of August 15, 2004.

The case has received considerable national attention, but the crime remained unsolved, until news given at a press conference on May 5, 2017, suggesting that authorities had solved the crime. In 2019 Shaun Gallon was sentenced to life in prison for the murders.

The victims 
Lindsay Cutshall and Jason Allen grew up in the Midwestern United States. Cutshall was from Fresno, Ohio and Allen was from Zeeland, Michigan. The couple met in 2002 while Cutshall was a student at the Appalachian Bible College in West Virginia, and became engaged six weeks later. They planned to marry in autumn of 2004.

Both Cutshall and Allen were counselors at Rock-N-Water, a Christian summer camp in El Dorado County, California. According to acquaintances, Cutshall and Allen had left the camp on a road trip the day before they were killed. Credit card receipts placed the duo at Fisherman's Wharf in San Francisco on August 14, 2004. Witnesses also reported seeing Cutshall's 1992 red Ford Tempo in the towns of Guerneville, Sebastopol, Forestville, and Jenner before the murders.

On Saturday - the probable night of the murder - it is speculated, but not confirmed, that the couple went to a local motel and restaurant called River's End but were unable to rent a room. They learned about the nearby beach, which is less than a mile from the restaurant. Since camping on the beach is illegal, it is unlikely the couple planned to camp for more than one night.

The bodies of the slain couple were not discovered until Wednesday, August 18, when the Sheriff's helicopter was dispatched following a report of a man who was stranded on a cliff above Fish Head Beach. The helicopter spotted the bodies and notified the department.

Investigation 
Homicide detectives from the Sonoma County Sheriff's Department launched an investigation into the deaths. The detectives quickly eliminated murder-suicide as an explanation to the killings. They also confirmed that none of Cutshall's or Allen's belongings had been taken, ruling out robbery as a motive, and that neither of them had been sexually assaulted.

Camping is prohibited on the rural stretch of beach where Cutshall and Allen met their deaths, but drifters and hitchhikers on State Route 1 (which runs alongside Fish Head Beach) are known to use the oceanfront site for sleeping. Initially, it was postulated that a drifter had murdered the young couple and then left the area. Despite an exhaustive effort by detectives, this avenue of the investigation never yielded any solid leads.

The weapon used was a .45-caliber Marlin Model 1894 long rifle, either a long colt style, or a carbine magazine. Although ballistics determined the gun type, police declined to publicly disclose it, in order "to eliminate false leads." The rifle is uncommon, considered too high caliber for most ranchers, and most likely would have required hand loaded ammunition. Shell casings were not found at the scene of the crime, suggesting the killer retrieved them.

On July 16, 2009, a 62-year-old drifter named Joseph Henry Burgess was killed in a shoot-out in the remote Jemez Mountains of New Mexico. Initially believed to be a suspect, Burgess's DNA was tested, and did not match that left at the Jenner crime scene.

2006 evidence 
In May 2006, 21 months after Cutshall and Allen were slain, Sonoma County Sheriff's detectives released new evidence in the case, which they hoped would generate new leads. New evidence including poems found near the crime scene, writings contained in a journal left for visitors inside a nearby driftwood hut, an empty 40-ounce bottle of Camo beer, and drawings inked onto pieces of driftwood near the site of the killings. Camo beer originates in Wisconsin, is no longer made, and is an uncommon beer in California. They also found a distinctive hat on a turnout above the beach on Hwy 1. Police wanted to know how the hat and beer bottle came to be in the places they were found.

The case remained unsolved at that time. The Sonoma County Sheriff's department offered a $50,000 reward for information.

2017 police press conference
The Sonoma County Sheriff's Office held a press conference on Friday, May 5, 2017, regarding major developments in the 2004 Jenner double murder case. The press conference was held at the Sheriff's Office building at 2796 Ventura Avenue in Santa Rosa. Attendees had been instructed to arrive by 10:15 AM. No additional information was provided until the press conference.

At 10:30 AM on May 5, 2017, Sonoma County Sheriff Steve Freitas read the following statement regarding the 2004 Jenner double murder case:

With this statement, police believe that they have identified the perpetrator of the double homicide as 38 year old Shaun Gallon, a resident of Forestville, California. Gallon had previously been arrested for the shooting death of his brother Shamus at their mother's home. Sheriff Steve Freitas of Sonoma County said that Gallon made statements about the crime that only the killer would know (Gallon described where exactly in their bodies he shot the victims), and that his office had also found corroborating evidence tying Gallon to the murders. The nature of this evidence has not been released by the authorities. (Gallon in fact led them to a soda can with the two bullit casings)

Gallon's motive for the killings of the couple and his brother have not yet been ascertained. No known connection to him between Lindsay Cutshall or Jason Allen has been uncovered yet either.

Charges and sentencing 
On May 17, 2018, Gallon was officially charged with the murders. Gallon had a history of criminal misconduct, including attempted murder with a package bomb in June 2004, a conviction for wounding a man with an arrow and allegedly killing his younger brother in March 2017.

In June 2019 Gallon entered no-contest pleas and admitted guilt in the crimes. The following month he was sentenced to serve three consecutive life terms without parole plus another 94 years in state prison for his crimes: the murders of Cutshall and Allen; the 2017 killing of his brother, Shamus Gallon; and an attempted murder in 2004 of a man in Monte Rio.

See also
 List of homicides in California

References

External links 
 Sonoma County Sheriff's Department's Jenner Homicide Investigation Update May 2006

2004 in California
Jenner, California Double-murder, 2004
August 2004 events in the United States
Deaths by firearm in California
History of Sonoma County, California
Murder in the San Francisco Bay Area
Victims of serial killers